Ruble or rouble is the name of currency units used in Russia and some other eastern European states.

Ruble or rouble may also refer to:

Currencies in circulation 
 Russian ruble
 Belarusian ruble
 Transnistrian ruble

Former currencies
This list may not contain all historical rubles, especially rubles issued by sub-national entities.

Soviet ruble
 Sovznak
 Ruble of the Far-Eastern Republic
 Transcaucasian ruble
 Chervonets
 Soviet ruble, in various Soviet republics the ruble carried local names as well

Pre-Soviet currencies
 Armenian ruble
 Azerbaijani ruble (ruble is the Russian name of the first Azerbaijani manat)
 Georgian ruble (ruble is the Russian name of the Georgian maneti)
 Latvian ruble
 
 Tajikistani ruble
 Transcaucasian ruble
 Ukrainian coupon (Ukrainian karbovanets)
 Tuvan akşa and kɵpejek

Imperial Russia
 Silver ruble (1704–1897), Assignation ruble (1769–1849), Constantine ruble (collectible)
 Gold ruble (1897–1917), Brut ruble (credit banknote)
 Copper ruble and Sestroretsk ruble

World War I and the Russian Civil War
 German ostrubel (1916–1918)
 Kerenka (1917–1919)
 Odessa ruble
 Don ruble
 Siberia ruble
 Harbin ruble

Others
Bouvet ruble (1938–1996)
 Lithuanian ruble or grivna (until 1579)

People
 Joseph Ruble Griffin (1923–1988), Justice of the Mississippi Supreme Court, United States
Rouble Nagi (b. 1980), Indian artist
 Patrick Rouble, Canadian politician

See also 
 Kopek (disambiguation)